Marijke Amado (born 1 February 1954, in Tilburg) is a Dutch television presenter.

Life 
From 1980 to 1990 she presented the television show WWF Club by German broadcaster WDR. In Germany, Amado became famous for her television presentation of a show called Mini Playback Show between 1990 and 1998. She was guest in different German television shows, for example Alfredissimo, Zimmer frei!, Blond am Freitag, Planet Wissen, Kachelmanns Spätausgabe, Das perfekte Promi-Dinner, Volle Kanne, Lafer!Lichter!Lecker!, Samstag Abend, Weck Up or Das NRW-Duell. Amado lives in Lanaken.

Works 
 Mr. Bink - Vom Traummann zum Albtraum, Riva-Verlag, 20

Literature 
 Ingo Schiweck: Laß dich überraschen... - Niederländische Unterhaltungskünstler in Deutschland nach 1945, Agenda-Verlag, 2005.

External links

References 

1954 births
Living people
Dutch television presenters
Dutch women television presenters
People from Tilburg
RTL Group people
ARD (broadcaster) people
20th-century Dutch women
20th-century Dutch people